Rochester is an unincorporated community in Noble County, in the U.S. state of Ohio.

History
The post office at Rochester was called Nobleville. This post office was established in 1851, and remained in operation until 1904.

References

Unincorporated communities in Noble County, Ohio
Unincorporated communities in Ohio